Marcelo Fabián Leopaldi Ledesma commonly known as Marcelo Ledesma in Argentina (born 2 April 1972) is a former Argentine footballer.

Club career
Leopaldi began his career with Club Atlético Huracán in 1993, he went on to play for several other teams in the Primera División Argentina including Deportivo Español, Banfield and Estudiantes de La Plata.  He spent two seasons with Ionikos in the Greek Super League, and had a loan spell at Monza in Serie B.

References

External links
 BDFA profile
 Argentine Primera statistics

1972 births
Living people
People from Santiago del Estero
Argentine footballers
Club Atlético Huracán footballers
Deportivo Español footballers
Club Atlético Banfield footballers
S.S.D. Pro Sesto players
Estudiantes de La Plata footballers
Club Deportivo Palestino footballers
Ionikos F.C. players
A.C. Monza players
Expatriate footballers in Chile
Expatriate footballers in Italy
Expatriate footballers in Greece
Association football midfielders
Sportspeople from Santiago del Estero Province